Ludivine Sagnier (born 3 July 1979) is a French actress and model who has appeared on screen since 1989. She was nominated three times for the César Award for Best Supporting Actress for Swimming Pool (2003), Peter Pan (2003), and A Secret (2007).

Personal life
Sagnier was born in La Celle-Saint-Cloud, in the département of Yvelines, France. Her mother is a retired secretary and her father is a professor of English at the Paris University.

Sagnier gave birth to her daughter Bonnie with her boyfriend, actor Nicolas Duvauchelle in 2005. Sagnier is the partner of French film director Kim Chapiron, with whom she has two daughters, Ly Lan, born in 2009 and Tàm, born in 2014.

Career
She made her film debut at the age of nine in Les Maris, les Femmes, les Amants, (1989) directed by Pascal Thomas. She had other small roles in the early 1990s, being directed by Alain Resnais and in Jean-Paul Rappeneau's Cyrano de Bergerac with Gerard Depardieu.

In 1994 she went to study at the Versailles Conservatoire, where she won a prize in classical music. Her return to cinema saw her gain commercial and critical success, notably in films directed by François Ozon. His musical comedy 8 Women (2002) was awarded acting prizes for Sagnier and her seven co-stars collectively.

The next year she starred alongside Charlotte Rampling in Ozon's psychological thriller Swimming Pool, a role which again garnered her nominations and prizes. Other notable films she has appeared in include Peter Pan, as Tinkerbell, and the crime thriller Mesrine: Public Enemy No.1.

Three films starring Sagnier screened in Los Angeles in 2011 where Sagnier was in attendance at all three screenings. Pieds nus sur les limaces (Lily Sometimes) was shown at the City of Angels, City of Light Festival in April. Love Crime and The Devil's Double were shown at the Los Angeles Film Festival in June.

Sagnier starred as Esther Aubry in the 2016 English-language drama series The Young Pope. She reprised the role in the follow-up miniseries The New Pope, released in 2020. Sagnier plays Claire in the French thriller series Lupin, which premiered on Netflix in January 2021.

Filmography

References

External links

 
 
 

Living people
20th-century French actresses
21st-century French actresses
European Film Award for Best Actress winners
French child actresses
French female models
French film actresses
French television actresses
People from Yvelines
French stage actresses
1979 births
Chopard Trophy for Female Revelation winners